Zhu Muzhi (25 December 1916 – 23 October 2015) was a Chinese politician. Zhu was a member of the 10th, 11th and 12th Central Committees of the Chinese Communist Party. Zhu served as president of the Xinhua News Agency, deputy head of the Propaganda Department of the Chinese Communist Party, Minister of Culture, and chairman of the State Council Information Office.

Biography
Zhu was born in Jiangyin, Jiangsu Province, China in December 1916. He graduated from Peking University in 1937, where he majored in foreign language.

After graduation, Zhu worked in Nanjing as an editor for Jinling Daily. Zhu joined the Chinese Communist Party in April 1938. From 1941 to 1943, Zhu worked in the Taihang Mountain.

From 1946 to 1964, Zhu worked in Xinhua News Agency as an editor. In 1966, the Cultural Revolution was launched by Mao Zedong, Zhu was arrested and suffered political persecution.

In September 1972, Zhu worked as the secretary of Xinhua News Agency. From December 1977 to April 1982, Zhu served as a deputy head of the Propaganda Department of the Chinese Communist Party. From April 1982 to March 1986, Zhu served as Minister of Culture of the People'e Republic of China. From April 1991 to December 1992, Zhu served as director of the State Council Information Office. In July 1993, he served as the newly founded China Society For Human Rights Studies, a position he held for almost fourteen years until May 2007. He retired in March 2004.

He died of illness in Beijing, on October 23, 2015, aged 98.

References

1916 births
People from Jiangyin
National University of Peking alumni
2015 deaths
Ministers of Culture of the People's Republic of China
Politicians from Wuxi
People's Republic of China politicians from Jiangsu
Chinese Communist Party politicians from Jiangsu
Republic of China journalists
Writers from Wuxi
People's Republic of China journalists
Victims of the Cultural Revolution
Xinhua News Agency people